Peltophorus polymitus is a species of true weevil in the beetle family Curculionidae. It is found in North America.

Subspecies
These two subspecies belong to the species Peltophorus polymitus:
 Peltophorus polymitus seminiveus b
 Peltophorus polymitus suffusus b
Data sources: i = ITIS, c = Catalogue of Life, g = GBIF, b = Bugguide.net

References

Further reading

 
 

Curculionidae
Articles created by Qbugbot
Beetles described in 1845